Gracco De Nardo (24 September 1893 – 22 April 1984) was an Italian footballer who played as a defender. He competed for Italy in the men's football tournament at the 1920 Summer Olympics.

References

External links
 

1893 births
1984 deaths
Italian footballers
Italy international footballers
Olympic footballers of Italy
Footballers at the 1920 Summer Olympics
People from Terni
Association football defenders
Genoa C.F.C. players
Sportspeople from the Province of Terni
Footballers from Umbria